The Manuk River (means: Bird River in Sundanese) is a river in West Java, Indonesia, about 170 km east of the capital Jakarta.

Hydrology

The whole parts of this river is located within West Java province. The river runs from south to the north and drained to Java Sea near the town of Indramayu. There are two river mouths: Cimanuk Lawas ("Old Cimanuk") and Cimanuk Anyar ("New Cimanuk").

Floods caused by the overflow of the river Cimanuk, in this Garut Regency hit on 21 September 2016, which damage at least 7 districts. some people lost, injured and even lost hundreds of homes.

Geography
The river flows in the western area of Java with predominantly tropical monsoon climate (designated as Am in the Köppen-Geiger climate classification). The annual average temperature in the area is 25 °C. The warmest month is October, when the average temperature is around 28 °C, and the coldest is February, at 21 °C. The average annual rainfall is 2465 mm. The wettest month is January, with an average of 461 mm rainfall, and the driest is September, with 6 mm rainfall.

See also
List of rivers of Indonesia
List of rivers of Java

References

Rivers of West Java
Rivers of Indonesia